Filip Suchý (born 16 December 1997) is a Czech professional ice hockey player. He is currently playing for HC Škoda Plzeň of the Czech Extraliga.

Suchý made his Czech Extraliga debut playing with HC Plzeň during the 2014–15 Czech Extraliga season.

Career statistics

Regular season and playoffs

References

External links

1997 births
Living people
Czech ice hockey forwards
HC Plzeň players
Omaha Lancers players
Västerviks IK players
Piráti Chomutov players
People from Plzeň-South District
Sportspeople from the Plzeň Region
Czech expatriate ice hockey players in Sweden
Czech expatriate ice hockey players in the United States